Dorcadion parnassi is a species of beetle in the family Cerambycidae. It was described by Kraatz in 1873. It is known from Greece. It contains the varietas Dorcadion parnassi var. albipenne.

References

parnassi
Beetles described in 1873